André Corthis, née Andrée Magdeleine Husson (15 April 1882  – 8 August 1952) was a 20th-century French writer. She received the prix Femina in 1906. Andrée Husson is the niece of painter Rodolphe Julian.

Biography 
Andrée Husson spent part of her youth in Spain, a country she often evoked. At the age of twelve, she began to line up rhymes and compose poems. In June 1906, totally unknown at 21, she published her first volume of verse: Gemmes et Moires. Six months later, all the illustrated magazines published her portrait and all the newspapers printed her name. She has just received a literary prize, the Prix Femina, awarded annually by the female jury of the great social magazine of the time:  and the sum of 5000 francs. She did not hide the influence of her masters: Charles Baudelaire, Henri de Régnier, and overall Paul Verlaine.

Andrée Husson married Raymond Lécuyer. She inherited the Académie Julian, the art gallery created in 1868 by her uncle, the painter Rodolphe Julian.

Her work L'Espagne de la victoire was an ode to Francoist Spain.

Selected work 
1906: Gemmes et Moires, collection of poetry,  — Prix Femina
1908: Mademoiselle Arguillis (Fasquelle)
1910: Le Pauvre Amour de Doña Balbine (Fasquelle)
1914: Le Pardon prématuré (Fasquelle)
1917: Petites Vies dans la tourmente (Éditions Pierre Lafitte)
1919: Pour moi seule, novel, Albin Michel, coll. "Le Roman littéraire" — Grand prix du roman de l'Académie française
1920: Sa vraie femme (Fasquelle)
1920: La Marâtre, Albin Michel
1921: L'Obsédé, Albin Michel
1923: L'Entraîneuse, novel, Albin Michel 
1925: Le Pardon prématuré, Joseph-Arthème Fayard, Collection : Le Livre de demain ; 9 
1926: Victime expiatoire, novel, Arthème Fayard et Cie ; coll. "Le Livre de demain" ; 41
1927: Tourmentes (Fayard - Le Livre de Demain)
1928: Les Rameaux rouges, Éditions Hachette, coll. "Bibliothèque bleue"
1928: Passion, Fayard et Cie éditeurs
1928: La Danseuse impassible (Les Éditions des portiques)
1929: La Fiancée perdue (A. Fayard et Cie)
1930: Pèlerinages en Espagne : Saint-Jacques de Compostelle, Salamanque, Tolède, Saragosse (Fasquelle)
1930: La Nuit incertaine (Bibliothèque-Charpentier, Fasquelle éditeurs)
1931: Soledad, novel (Albin Michel)
1932: Appel de flammes, novel (Albin Michel)
1934: Le Printemps sous l'orage, novel, Arthème Fayard et Cie
1935: Le Merveilleux Retour (Albin Michel)
1936: Du couvent aux Cortès (Arthème Fayard)
1936: Le Cœur forcé, Éditions Gallimard, coll. "La Renaissance de la nouvelle" 
1937: La Chouette écartelée, Arthème Fayard
1938: Révoltées (Les Éditions de France)
1938: Masques, A. Fayard
1939: Cris dans le ciel, A. Fayard
1941: Destinées, A. Fayard
1941: L'Espagne de la victoire, A. Fayard
1944: L'Otage, A. Fayard
1945: Séverine, A. Fayard
1946: Lettres anonymes, A. Fayard
1949: Le Mystère des Trois-Gours, A. Fayard
1951: La Mesure d'aimer, A. Fayard

 References 

 External links 

 André Corthis on Babelio
 André Corthis on the site of the Académie française
 Some poems by André Corthis
 V. ANDRÉ CORTHIS on Revue des deux mondes''

20th-century French non-fiction writers
Prix Femina winners
Grand Prix du roman de l'Académie française winners
Writers from Paris
1882 births
1952 deaths
20th-century French women writers